Pentanal (also called valeraldehyde) is the organic compound  with molecular formula . Classified as an alkyl aldehyde, it is a colorless volatile liquid.  Its odor is described as fermented, bready, fruity, nutty, berry.

Production
Pentanal is obtained by hydroformylation of butene. Also C4 mixtures can be used as starting material like the so-called raffinate II, which is produced by steam cracking and contains (Z)- and (E)-2-butene, 1-butene, butane and isobutane. The conversion to the product is accomplished with synthesis gas in the presence of a catalyst consisting of a rhodium-bisphosphite complex and a sterically hindered secondary amine with a selectivity toward pentanal of at least 90%.

Use
Pentanal undergoes the reactions characteristic of any alkyl aldehyde, i.e., oxidations, condensations, and reductions.  2-Octanone, produced for use in the fragrance industry, is obtained by the condensation of acetone and pentanal, followed by hydrogenation of the alkene. 

2-Propyl-2-heptenal is obtained from pentanal by aldol condensation, which is hydrogenated to the saturated branched 2-propylheptanol. This alcohol serves as a starting material for the PVC plasticizer di-2-propylheptyl phthalate (DPHP).

Pentanal (valeraldehyde) is oxidized to give valeric acid.

References

Alkanals